Marco Gaiser (born January 11, 1993) is a German footballer who plays for SSV Reutlingen 05 in the Oberliga Baden-Württemberg.

References

Marco Gaiser verstärkt den FC 08 Homburg, homburg1.de, 23 January 2016

External links

1993 births
Sportspeople from Tübingen
Footballers from Baden-Württemberg
Living people
German footballers
Association football midfielders
Stuttgarter Kickers II players
Stuttgarter Kickers players
FC 08 Homburg players
TSG Balingen players
SSV Reutlingen 05 players
3. Liga players
Regionalliga players
Oberliga (football) players